UNICEF Australia and the National Children’s and Youth Law Centre (NCYLC) co-convene the Child Rights Taskforce, Australia’s peak child rights body made up of almost 100 organisations, advocating for the protection of child rights in Australia. Its goal is to lead the sector-wide approach to the UN on how we think the Australian Government is faring in its commitment to children.

The Child Rights Taskforce is made up of advocates, service providers, individuals and experts all focused on achieving child rights in Australia. It meets regularly to discuss upcoming opportunities and events to promote and protect child rights in Australia. One of the main roles of the Taskforce is to hold the Australian government to account on its commitment to the UN Convention on the Rights of the Child (CRC).

Members 
The following organisations play a leadership role as the "steering committee" of the coalition:
 Australian Youth Affairs Coalition
 Human Rights Law Centre
 King & Wood Mallesons
 National Children’s and Youth Law Centre (NCYLC)
 NATSILS
 Save the Children Australia
 SNAICC
 UNICEF Australia

The "Listen To Children" Report 
When Australia ratified the CRC in 1990, our government committed to making sure that every child in Australia has every right in the convention. This is monitored by the UN Committee on the Rights of the Child, a panel of independent experts who the Australian Government reports to every five years.

The Australian Child Rights Taskforce is also given the opportunity to submit an independent report to ensure the UN is briefed on the whole story.

In 2011, the Child Rights Taskforce published the Listen to Children Report, compiled following consultations with over 750 children and young people and over 100 organisations and subject matters. It found that while Australia is a wonderful place for most of its children, certain children are disadvantaged by the failure of governments.

Despite Australia’s ratification of the CRC in 1990, Australia has yet to effectively incorporate human rights into policy and legislative framework to benefit children and there are unacceptable gaps in the legal protection of children’s rights. Three groups of children are especially disadvantaged by the failure of governments: 
•	Aboriginal and Torres Strait Islander children have child mortality rates of three times their non-aboriginal peers and are the least consulted in Australian policy; they Aboriginal children aged 10–17 are 24 times more likely to be jailed than non-Aboriginal children and Aboriginal children are almost 10 times more likely to be in out-of-home care.
•	428 children of asylum seekers remain in detention facilities in direct contravention to UN convention (At the time of publication, 1,048 children were in immigration detention)
•	 The numbers of children in out-of-home-care has increased by 51.5 per cent since 2005, yet Australia collects no data on the reasons why children are placed in care;
The Report also acknowledged that there has been some progress over the past five years. Positive developments include: commitment to the National Early Childhood Development Strategy, its implementation of a National Framework for Protecting Australia’s Children, the Plan to Reduce Violence against Women and their Children, and the commitment to Closing the Gap on Aboriginal health and education.
A total of 84 organisations and individuals endorsed the Report in whole or in part. 
The Listen to Children report became the primary reference document to challenge the Australian government representatives when they came before the UN in June 2012.

The Listen to Children report seeks to parallel the Australian Government's report on its implementation of the convention on the Rights of the Child.

It writes about Australia's legal and administrative implementation of the convention, and on whether the implementation has been effective. A summary of its conclusions are as follows:

Legislation 
The convention on the Rights of the Child creates international benchmarks for child rights. However, because the convention is not fully integrated into Australian law, there are no enforceable remedies for many child rights violations in Australia. Australia needs nationally consistent legislation based on the convention.

Coordination 
Under our federal system, responsibility for many children’s rights, such as education, child protection and juvenile justice fall to the states. Because the UN Convention is not the underlying framework, state policies are inconsistent. For example, Queensland detains children over the age of 17 in adult facilities – in contravention of international law. A National Plan of Action would have an important function to ensure states and territories meet international obligations.

Consultation 
Mechanisms for involving children in decision-making in Australia are poor. From finding out what makes a good school, to understanding the special needs of indigenous, rural, or refugee children, or children with a disability or in out-of home care; Australia does not follow best practise for finding out and incorporating the views of children. Where legislation does require children to participate in the decisions made about them, there tends to be no evaluation of how effectively this is achieved. Australia needs to learn more from examples of best practise for children’s participation and implement these mechanisms across public policy.

Data and Monitoring 
The catalogue of things Australia does not know about its children is surprisingly large. Australia does not know the different reasons why its children live in out-of-home-care, we do not know about the reasons for and occurrence of suicide or attempted suicide in children and young people. Australia doesn't have nationally consistent data on indigenous communities and children. In order to begin creating and implementing policies and systems that help children, we need more information on their health, 
wellbeing, experiences and opinions.

Reporting 
The National Child Rights Taskforce, alongside the University of Technology, Sydney's Law Students' Society sent Janani Muhunthan as a "youth reporter," amongst other Taskforce members, to Geneva to monitor the Australian Government's Child Rights review in front of the UN.

United Nations Committee on the Rights of the Child National Review of Australia in 2012
On 4–5 June 2012, the Australian Government came before the UN Committee on the Rights of the Child to respond to questions on its commitment to improving the fundamental rights and welfare of its children.

External links
 National Child Rights Taskforce webpage
 Listen to Children Report
 Youth Reporter Blog

References 

Children's rights authorities